San José de Ushua District is one of ten districts of the province Paucar del Sara Sara in Peru.

See also 
 Lujmani

References